Alan William Secord (born March 3, 1958) is a Canadian former professional ice hockey left wing who played in the National Hockey League for twelve seasons from 1978–79 until 1989–90. In 2023, he retired as a Captain for American Airlines, flying Boeing 737s.

Playing career
Secord played on the 1976 Memorial Cup winning team, Hamilton Fincups of the OHA.

Secord was drafted 16th overall by the Boston Bruins in the 1978 NHL Amateur Draft. He made the Bruins' roster as a 20-year-old, scoring 16 goals and adding seven assists. He improved to 23 goals in 1979–80, but after failing to score in his first 18 games the following season, he was dealt to the Chicago Blackhawks on December 18, 1980, in a trade for defenceman Mike O'Connell.

In Chicago, Secord enjoyed the best years of his NHL career. In 1981–82, he scored 44 goals in 80 games. He was also assessed 303 minutes in penalties, making him the only player in NHL history to record 40 goals and 300 penalty minutes in a single season.

Secord joined the 50-goal club in 1982–83, posting 54 goals and 32 assists for a career-high 86 points and played in the NHL All-Star Game for the second consecutive season, but injuries began to take their toll. He played just 14 games in 1983–84, and it took him two full seasons to regain his scoring touch. Secord responded with a 40-goal campaign in 1985–86, but after a 29-goal season in 1986–87, Secord was dealt to the Toronto Maple Leafs on September 3, 1987. Secord and Ed Olczyk went to Toronto, while Rick Vaive, Steve Thomas and defenceman Bob McGill headed to Chicago.

Secord spent two seasons with the Maple Leafs and was sent to the Philadelphia Flyers midway through 1988–89 for a fifth-round draft pick in 1989 that the Buffalo Sabres eventually used to select defenceman Keith Carney.

Secord re-signed with Chicago as a free agent and finished his NHL career in 1990, scoring 14 times in 43 games. He retired from pro hockey until 1994, when he returned to play two seasons with the International Hockey League's (now American Hockey League) Chicago Wolves. He also played a season of roller hockey with the Chicago Cheetahs.

Secord played 766 career NHL games, scoring 273 goals and 222 assists for 495 points and registered 2,093 career penalty minutes.

Personal life
Secord is now an airline pilot with American Airlines and resides in Southlake, Texas, a suburb of Fort Worth. He has three sons, Ryan, Alec and Luke.  He sometimes does work on behalf of the Chicago Blackhawks' Alumni Association. Secord also coaches youth hockey in the Dallas area with the Texas Jr. Brahmas organization.

Career statistics

Regular season and playoffs

International

Roller hockey statistics
                                           --- Regular Season --- 
Season   Team                        Lge    GP    G    A  Pts  PIM 
   1994  Chicago Cheetahs            RHI    18   11   14   25   45
------------------------------------------------------------------

See also
List of NHL players with 2000 career penalty minutes

References

External links
 

1958 births
Boston Bruins draft picks
Boston Bruins players
Canadian ice hockey left wingers
Chicago Blackhawks players
Chicago Cheetahs players
Chicago Wolves (IHL) players
Commercial aviators
Hamilton Fincups players
Ice hockey people from Ontario
Living people
National Hockey League All-Stars
National Hockey League first-round draft picks
Philadelphia Flyers players
Rochester Americans players
Sportspeople from Greater Sudbury
Springfield Indians players
Toronto Maple Leafs players